Sandra Deleglise (born 9 February 1976) is a French short track speed skater. She competed in the women's 3000 metre relay event at the 1994 Winter Olympics.

References

External links
 

1976 births
Living people
French female short track speed skaters
Olympic short track speed skaters of France
Short track speed skaters at the 1994 Winter Olympics
People from Saint-Jean-de-Maurienne
Sportspeople from Savoie
20th-century French women